The Bell Mountain AVA  is an American Viticultural Area located in Gillespie County, Texas. The appellation is entirely contained within the Texas Hill Country AVA, which was established nine years after Bell Mountain AVA. As of 2006, there were nine wineries in the appellation.

References

American Viticultural Areas
Texas Hill Country
Texas wine
Regions of Texas
Geography of Gillespie County, Texas
1986 establishments in Texas